Nevada City (originally, Ustumah, a Nisenan village; later, Nevada, Deer Creek Dry Diggins, and Caldwell's Upper Store) is the county seat of Nevada County, California, United States,  northeast of Sacramento,  southwest of Reno and  northeast of San Francisco. The population was 3,068 as of the 2010 Census.

History

European-Americans first settled Nevada City in 1849, during the California Gold Rush, as Nevada (Spanish for "snow-covered", a reference to the snow-topped mountains in the area). The Gold Tunnel on the north side of Deer Creek was the city's first mine, built in 1850. The first sawmill in Nevada City was built on Deer Creek, just above town, in August 1850, by Lewis & Son, with a water wheel. In 1850–51, Nevada City was the state's most important mining town, and Nevada County the state's leading gold-mining county. In 1851, The Nevada Journal became the first newspaper published in the town and county. The first cemetery in town, the Pioneer Cemetery, was founded around 1851 behind the Nevada City United Methodist Church, Nevada County's first denominational church.

The town of Nevada was incorporated on April 19, 1856. In 1864, the word “City” was added to its name to relieve confusion with the nearby state of Nevada, and the town has legally been known as Nevada City ever since. The former town of Coyoteville later became Nevada City's northwestern section.

Buildings and structures

The Nevada City Downtown Historic District covers the downtown section roughly bounded by Spring, Bridge, Commercial, York, Washington, Coyote, and Main Streets. Several historical buildings have received National Register of Historic Places or California Historical Landmark status, and have been preserved. These include:
 Court house and city hall Art Moderne facades are attributable to Works Progress Administration projects.
 Doris Foley Library for Historical Research (NRHP No. 90001809), 211 North Pine Street, is a Carnegie library.
 Miners Foundry (CHL No. 1012), 325 Spring Street, was the first manufacturing location of the Pelton wheel.
 National Hotel (CHL No. 899), 211 Broad Street, is one of the oldest continuously operating hotels west of the Rocky Mountains.
 Nevada City Firehouse No. 2
 Nevada Brewery (NRHP No. 85002303), 107 Sacramento Street, was used for brewing and serving lager beer to the mining community.
 Nevada Theatre (CHL No. 863), 401 Broad Street, is California's oldest original-use theatre.
 South Yuba Canal Office (CHL No. 832), 134 Main Street, was used during the period of 1857 to 1880.

Geography

Nevada, Missouri, is named after Nevada City.

Most of Nevada City lies on brown sandy loam soils of the Hoda series which developed on granitic rock.

Demographics

2010
The 2010 United States Census reported that Nevada City had a population of 3,068. The racial makeup of Nevada City was 2,837 (92.5%) White, 26 (0.8%) African American, 28 (0.9%) Native American, 46 (1.5%) Asian, 0 (0%) Pacific Islander, 40 (1.3%) from other races, and 91 (0.4%) from two or more races. Hispanic or Latino of any race were 205 persons (6.7%).

The Census reported that 2,829 people (92.2% of the population) lived in households, 56 (1.8%) lived in non-institutionalized group quarters, and 183 (6.0%) were institutionalized.

There were 1,356 households, out of which 317 (23.4%) had children under the age of 18 living in them, 510 (37.6%) were opposite-sex married couples living together, 155 (11.4%) had a female householder with no husband present, 79 (5.8%) had a male householder with no wife present.  There were 97 (7.2%) unmarried opposite-sex partnerships, and 15 (1.1%) same-sex married couples or partnerships. 488 households (36.0%) were made up of individuals, and 168 (12.4%) had someone living alone who was 65 years of age or older. The average household size was 2.09.  There were 744 families (54.9% of all households); the average family size was 2.67.

The population was spread out, with 517 people (16.9%) under the age of 18, 199 people (6.5%) aged 18 to 24, 720 people (23.5%) aged 25 to 44, 1,075 people (35.0%) aged 45 to 64, and 557 people (18.2%) who were 65 years of age or older.  The median age was 47.5 years. For every 100 females, there were 100.4 males.  For every 100 females age 18 and over, there were 101.8 males.

The homeowner vacancy rate was 3.8%; the rental vacancy rate was 4.8%.  1,678 people (54.7% of the population) lived in owner-occupied housing units and 1,151 people (37.5%) lived in rental housing units.

2000
As of the census of 2000, there were 3,001 people, 1,313 households, and 740 families residing in the city. The racial makeup of the city was 94.3% White, 0.4% African American, 1.4% Native American, 0.7% Asian, <0.1% Pacific Islander, 0.7% from other races, and 2.4% from two or more races. Hispanic or Latino of any race were 3.5% of the population.

There were 1,313 households, out of which 25.4% had children under the age of 18 living with them, 38.1% were married couples living together, 13.3% had a female householder with no husband present, and 43.6% were non-families. 35.0% of all households were made up of individuals, and 10.4% had someone living alone who was 65 years of age or older.  The average household size was 2.14 and the average family size was 2.71.

In the city, the population was spread out, with 19.7% under the age of 18, 7.4% from 18 to 24, 25.9% from 25 to 44, 32.2% from 45 to 64, and 14.9% who were 65 years of age or older.  The median age was 44 years. For every 100 females, there were 97.2 males.  For every 100 females age 18 and over, there were 95.4 males.

The median income for a household in the city was $36,667, and the median income for a family was $46,149. Males had a median income of $32,070 versus $29,183 for females. The per capita income for the city was $22,399.  About 1.7% of families and 7.9% of the population were below the poverty line, including 2.5% of those under age 18 and 3.8% of those age 65 or over.

Government
Nevada City elects a five-member city council. Council members select the mayor and vice mayor from their ranks. Council members appoint residents to a five-member Planning Commission.

Nevada City launched a "Goat Fund Me" campaign to raise $25,000 to have goats graze through dense brush in the municipal greenbelt. Nevada City is considered particularly at risk of wildfire, a "very high fire hazard severity zone" because of its wooded steep hillsides, narrow streets, 19th-century Gold Rush-era homes, and thick tree canopy.

County, state, and federal representation
Nevada City is in Nevada County. The District 1 Supervisor is Heidi Hall.

According to the California Secretary of State, as of February 10, 2019, Nevada City has 2,353 registered voters. Of those, 1,225 (52.1%) are registered Democrats, 384 (16.3%) are registered Republicans, and 297 (12.6%) have declined to state a political party.

Economy

Tourism, government services, digital media industry, resource extraction (timber) and commercial services are the basis of the local economy..

Tourism
Tourists visit Nevada City for outdoor recreation, history, fine arts and entertainment and special events. Nevada City attracts vacationers in all four seasons and is a popular weekend getaway for visitors in Northern California and Nevada. Nevada City serves as a base for recreation in the nearby Tahoe National Forest, South Yuba River and the High Sierras. It is 45 minutes from Donner Summit area skiing and 60–90 minutes from Lake Tahoe ski areas. Nevada City's tourist attractions include:
South Yuba River State Park — Four season hiking and gold panning, spring whitewater boating and summer/fall swimming on the federally designated Wild and Scenic South Yuba River.
 Historic downtown area — Much of the city's downtown area (bisected by Broad Street) is in the National Register of Historic Places. Most of the buildings date from the 19th century.
 The Nevada City Classic — Since 1960, downtown is the site for a challenging professional cycling race. Races for juniors, men, and women usually take place on Father's Day Weekend. The race attracts thousands of visitors. In June 2009, Lance Armstrong was the winner.
 Nevada City Winery was the first bonded winery to open in Nevada County after Prohibition.

Culture
Live music, theater and dance are performed nearly continually at Miners Foundry Cultural Center and the Nevada Theatre.

Museums and galleries
The Nevada County Historical Society operates Historic Firehouse No. 1 Museum downtown and the Nevada County Narrow Gauge Railroad Museum in the Seven Hills Business District area. The Miners Foundry Cultural Center has a small museum. Many businesses also have displays of photos and historic artifacts dating to the Gold Rush and pioneer eras. Several art galleries and businesses exhibit fine art.

Recurring events
Several major cultural events occur annually, including Victorian Christmas (street fair), Summer Nights (street fair), Mardi Gras, Fourth of July Parade, Teddy Bear Convention, and Psychic Faire.
The Constitution Day Parade is held the second Sunday of September since 1967. It is one of the oldest and largest Constitution observances in the western United States. The event features youth, business and nonprofit entries, the Ophir Prison Marching Kazoo Band and, since 1987, the Famous Marching Presidents (and their First Ladies).
 Wild & Scenic Film Festival — Beginning in 2003, the festival has showcased films on a full range of environmental issues and films emphasizing outdoor adventure and extreme sports. The event takes place in January and occupies multiple venues in downtown Nevada City. It has become one of the largest film festivals of its kind in the nation.
 Nevada City Film Festival — Started in 2001, the festival has grown from a showcase for local filmmakers to an international film festival hosting notable filmmakers from around the country including director Mike Mills (Thumbsucker, The Beginners), director Jonathan Krisel (Portlandia), actress and comedian Natasha Leggero (Last Comic Standing), and Tim Heidecker and Eric Wareheim of Tim and Eric Awesome Show, Great Job! The annual festival is held over the course of four days in August. The Nevada City Film Festival has been called "The Sundance of the Foothills".
 Nevada City Storytelling Festival — At the North Columbia Schoolhouse Cultural Center in nearby North Columbia, the festival has attracted major national and regional storytellers since 1985. The event takes place each July in a pine-shaded amphitheater built specifically for storytelling.
 Summer Nights – An outdoor street festival of art and music held several Wednesday evenings in July. During Summer Nights, Nevada City's landmark historic district is closed to motorized traffic and filled with arts, crafts, classic cars, food, drink and music. 
 Victorian Christmas – This annual family tradition takes place two Wednesday evenings and three Sunday afternoons in December, and features holiday activities for all ages: carriage rides, arts & crafts, live entertainment, and savory yuletide treats and libations. The streets of downtown Nevada City are closed to motorized traffic for Victorian Christmas.

Twin town
Nevada City is twinned with Penzance, a seaside town in Cornwall, UK, and the nearby tin and copper mining town of St Just in Penwith, Cornwall, UK. The twinning is a result of Cornish migration during the Californian gold rush in which Cornish mining expertise migrated to the area. City Hall has a room dedicated to the twinning and houses Cornish memorabilia and items donated on various exchanges. Penzance Youth Wind Band has joined forces with Nevada Union High School's instrumental music department on two occasions.

Film location
An abundance of historic buildings, autumn leaf color and attractive natural surroundings have made Nevada City an ongoing setting for film and television productions, including feature films and commercials. The area is also a popular location for photography. Modern-day Nevada City was the setting for the 2006 Hallmark Channel original movie, The Christmas Card.

Education
Nevada City has its own school district with three schools: Deer Creek (K-4), Seven Hills (5–8) and Nevada City Charter School (K-8). Other large schools in the area include Nevada City School of the Arts, Yuba River Charter School, and Forest Charter School

After 8th grade, most students attend Nevada Union High School in nearby Grass Valley as part of the Nevada Joint Union School District. Other high schools in the area include Silver Springs High School, Ghidotti High School, Sierra Academy of Expeditionary Learning, Forest Charter, Bitney Prep High School, Bear River, and other smaller private and charter schools.

Higher education
Other local schools include the California College of Ayurveda and Connected Communities Academy.

Climate
Although exceedingly heavy snow falls on the nearby mountains, it rarely falls in the city.

Notable people

Alexis Alford (born 1998), youngest person to travel to every country
Tina Basich (born 1969), professional snowboarder
Donald J. Butz, U.S. Air Force (born 1933), Major General
Jennie Carter (1830–1881) African-American journalist and essayist
Anthony Chabot (1813–1888), 19th-century businessman and entrepreneur; co-inventor of hydraulic mining in Nevada City
Peter Collier (born 1939), political author
Joseph Cornell (born 1950), naturalist and author
Alela Diane (born 1983), singer/songwriter
Matt DiBenedetto (born 1991), NASCAR driver
Heather Donahue, actress, American writer
Eleanor Dumont (1829-1879), professional gambler
Alasdair Fraser (born 1955), Scottish fiddler and owner of Culburnie Records
Noah Georgeson (born 1975), musician, producer
Felix Gillet (1835–1908), pioneer California horticulturist
Oakley Hall (1920–2008), novelist
Robert M. Hunt (1828–1902), physician
Roger Hodgson (born 1950), singer/songwriter and ex-Supertramp member
Swami Kriyananda (1926–2013), spiritual teacher and founder of Ananda Village
Cliff Kushler, inventor
Charles Marsh, possibly Nevada City's first resident and namer of the town
Tully Marshall (1864–1943), actor
John McEntire (born 1970), drummer, recording engineer, and music producer
Thomas Bard McFarland (1828–1908), associate justice of the Supreme Court of California
Stephen McNallen (born 1948), Germanic Neopagan leader and writer
Joanna Newsom (born 1982), harpist, singer/songwriter, and actress
Tim O'Connor (1927–2018), actor
John Olmsted (1938–2011),  naturalist, co-creator of The Independence Trail State Park
Utah Phillips (1935–2008), folk singer, activist
Ed Reimers (1912–2009), actor and television announcer
Terry Riley (born 1935), composer
 Gyan Riley (born 1977), guitarist and composer
Alexander Rossi (born 1991), professional race car driver
 Julia Ann Rudolph (c. 1820–c. 1900), photographer who had a studio in the city from 1856 to around 1860
Aaron A. Sargent (1827–1887), U.S. Senator
Lorenzo Sawyer (1820–1891), Chief Justice of the California Supreme Court
Niles Searls (1825–1907), Chief Justice of the Supreme Court of California
Claus Sievert (1949–2009), printmaker, illustrator
Mariee Sioux (born 1985), singer/songwriter
Gary Snyder (born 1930), poet
Rosie Stephenson-Goodknight (born 1953), editor
Evan Strong (born 1986), professional snowboarder
Heinrich Sylvester Theodor Tiling (1818–1871), physician and botanist

Downtown gallery

See also
Scotts Flat Lake
Tahoe National Forest
Yuba River
The Willo Steakhouse

References

Further reading
 Davis, H. P. (1940). National hotel and coffee shop, Nevada City, California.
 Hagaman, W. R. (2001). A short history of the Chinese cemetery at Nevada City, California: and Chinese burial customs during the Gold Rush. Nevada City, CA: Cowboy Press.
 Hattich, L. (1969). Feasibility study on Nevada City Theater, Nevada City, California. Boulder, Colo: Economic Development Internship Program, Western Interstate Commission for Higher Education.
 Hidden Nugget Placer Mining Co. (1910). Hidden Nugget Placer Mining Company, Nevada City, California. Nevada City, CAlif: The Company.
 Mann, R. (1982). After the Gold Rush: society in Grass Valley and Nevada City, California, 1849–1870. Stanford, Calif: Stanford University Press.

 Nevada City Chamber of Commerce. (1932). Homes among the hills: Nevada City, California : gold, health, happiness. Nevada City, Calif.?: Nevada City Chamber of Commerce?.

External links

Nevada City Chamber of Commerce
Nevada City at Western Mining History. Accessed 8/22/2021.

 
Cities in Nevada County, California
County seats in California
Incorporated cities and towns in California
Mining communities of the California Gold Rush
Populated places in the Sierra Nevada (United States)
Populated places established in 1849
Populated places established in 1856
1849 establishments in California
1856 establishments in California
Cities in Sacramento metropolitan area